Carlos Espinoza may refer to:

 Carlos Espinoza (cyclist) (born 1951), Peruvian cyclist
 Carlos Espinoza (footballer, born 1928), Chilean footballer
 Carlos Espinoza (footballer, born 1985), Chilean footballer
 Carlos Espinoza (dancer) (born 1981), Argentine dancer

See also
 Carlos Espinosa (born 1982), Chilean footballer